Ladda celsus is a species of butterfly in the family Hesperiidae. It is found in Ecuador.

References

Butterflies described in 2002